Singicherra Massacre, also known as Singicherra No. 2 Bazaar Massacre, refers to the  massacre of 16 unarmed Bengali Hindu villagers on 13 January 2002 at Singicherra by the terrorists of National Liberation Front of Tripura.

History 
On 13 January 2002, on the eve of Makar Sankranti, Bengali people came to Singicherra market of Khowai subdivision for purchasing purpose. Suddenly two groups of National Liberation Front of Tripura insurgents encircled the market in the evening and sprayed bullets indiscriminately killing 16 Bengali people on the spot and injuring 9.

References 

Massacres of Bengali Hindus in India
Crime in Tripura
2002 murders in India
Ethnic cleansing in Asia

Khowai_district